R. U. Sirius (born Ken Goffman in 1952) is an American writer, editor, talk show host, musician and cyberculture celebrity. He is best known as co-founder and original editor-in-chief of Mondo 2000 magazine from 1989 to 1993. Before that he founded and edited  the magazines High Frontiers and Reality Hackers. Sirius was   chairman and candidate in the 2000 U.S. presidential election for the Revolution Party. The party's 20-point platform was a hybrid of libertarianism and liberalism.

At one time, he was a regular columnist for Wired News and San Francisco Examiner, and contributing writer for Wired and Artforum International. He's also written for Rolling Stone, Time, Esquire and other publications. Sirius has written several hundred articles and essays for mainstream and subculture publications. He was editor-in-chief of Axcess magazine in 1998, GettingIt.com 1999–2000, and H+ Magazine 2008–2010.

Activities

1990s
In 1993 R.U. Sirius was quoted in The Nation magazine about the internet and its future. This July 1993 piece, The Whole World is Talking, was The Nations first article about the internet.

Sirius recruited Timothy Leary to be a contributing editor for Mondo 2000 and has taught an online course in Leary's philosophy for the Maybe Logic Academy. He co-authored Leary's last book, Design for Dying (1998), and wrote the introduction for a 1998 edition of Leary's 1968 book The Politics of Ecstasy.

Sirius appeared in the films Synthetic Pleasures (1995) and Conceiving Ada (1997). His mid-1990s techno-rock band Mondo Vanilli recorded an unreleased CD titled IOU Babe for Trent Reznor's Nothing Records. The music was available on the internet for several years and is currently available on bandcamp IOU Babe, by Mondo Vanilli.

Sirius has been a speaker at many events, such as the Starwood Festival . He delivered the second Keynote address for the Virtual Reality conference, Oslo VR, in 1994.

2000s
During the 2000s Sirius published four books. In 2005 he began hosting two weekly podcasts, the RU Sirius Show and NeoFiles. Both went on unannounced hiatus in August 2007 because their financial backer withdrew his support. In September 2006 Sirius helped launch the webzine 10 Zen Monkeys with fellow GettingIt.com alumni Jeff Diehl and Lou Cabron. All these projects were part of a media network named MondoGlobo.

From October 2008 to May 2010, Sirius was head editor of the transhumanist magazine H+ Magazine. He then turned his attention to a project documenting the history of Mondo 2000.

2010s
On June 7, 2011, R. U. Sirius launched Acceler8or a counter-culture, Singularitarian/Transhumanist website. It went on hiatus in November 2012. Mondo 2000 was relaunched online in 2017.

Bibliography

Books
 Transcendence: The Disinformation Encyclopedia of Transhumanism and the Singularity. (2015) (with Jay Cornell). Disinformation Books. .
 Everybody Must Get Stoned. Rock Stars On Drugs. (2009). Citadel. .
 True Mutations. (2007) Pollinator Press. .
 Counterculture Through the Ages: From Abraham to Acid House. (2004) Villard Books. .
 The Revolution: Quotations From Revolution Party Chairman R. U. Sirius. (2000) Feral House. .
 21st Century Revolutionary: R. U. Sirius 1984–1998. (1999) Fringecore .
 Design for Dying. (1998) (with Timothy Leary) HarperCollins. .
 How to Mutate & Take Over the World: an Exploded Post-Novel. (1997) (with St. Jude) Random House. .
 Cyberpunk Handbook: The Real Cyberpunk Fakebook. (1995) (with St. Jude and Bart Nagel) Random House. .
 Mondo 2000: A User's Guide to the New Edge. (1992) (editor with Rudy Rucker & Queen Mu) Harperperennial Library. .

Articles

 Steal This Millennium. With Stew Albert. Salon.com, October 19, 2000.
 The RU Sirius Show and NeoFiles. 80-odd podcast interviews, and counting. (With co-hosts including Sherry Miller, Diana Brown, Steve Robles and producer Jeff Diehl.)
 "Todd Brendan Fahey and His Acid-Laden Writing Style"

References

External links 
 
 
 R.U. Sirius at Discogs
 R.U. Sirius Radio
 
 Sirius' weblog at 10ZenMonkeys.com
 "Yes, We Are: An Interview with RU Sirius"

1952 births
American columnists
American male journalists
American libertarians
American magazine editors
American online publication editors
American talk radio hosts
American psychedelic drug advocates
Living people
American transhumanists